The Zambia National U-23 Football team is the U-23 football team for Zambia founded in 1929. The team, also known as the Youth Chipolpolo, represents the country in international under-23 matches and is controlled by the Football Association of Zambia.

Current squad
 The following players were called up for the 2023 Africa U-23 Cup of Nations qualification matches.
 Match dates: 22 and 29 October 2022
 Opposition: Caps and goals correct as of:' 21 October 2022

Recent results & fixtures
The following is a list of match results from the previous 12 months, as well as any future matches that have been scheduled.

2018

2019

Competitive records
Olympic Games

Prior to the 1992 Olympic Games campaign, the Olympic football tournament was open to full senior national teams.

Africa U-23 Cup of Nations

All Africa Games*Draws include knockout matches decided by penalty shootout.''

References

African national under-23 association football teams
under-23